Kharan can refer to:

 Kharan, Pakistan, city in Balochistan.
 Kharan District, district of Balochistan, Pakistan
 Kharan (princely state), former princely state
 Kharan Desert
 The upper Halil River
 Haran, Azerbaijan